Slazenger is a British sports equipment brand owned by the Frasers Group (formerly Sports Direct). The company was established as a sporting goods shop in 1881 by Ralph and Albert Slazenger on London's Cannon Street. Slazenger was acquired by Dunlop Rubber in 1959. Dunlop was acquired by BTR in 1985. Sports Direct acquired the business in 2004.

The Frasers Group offers a range of products under the "Slazenger" label, including equipment for cricket, field hockey, golf, swimming, and tennis, including athletic shoes and a clothing line.

Slazenger has the longest-running sporting sponsorship in the world, thanks to its association with the Wimbledon Tennis Championship, providing balls for the tournament since 1902. Slazenger also produced the official match ball for the 1966 FIFA World Cup.

History 
In 1881, Ralph and Albert Slazenger, Jewish brothers from Manchester, established a shop on London's Cannon Street, selling rubber sporting goods. Slazenger quickly became a leading manufacturer of sporting equipment for golf and tennis. Four years after the All England Lawn Tennis and Croquet Club held its first-ever championships in 1877, Slazenger produced 'The New Game of Lawn Tennis' (tennis rackets and balls) complete in a box.

Their plant in Barnsley manufactured tennis balls and exported them round the world. The plant closed in 2002, and production is now based in the Philippines.

In 1902, Slazenger was appointed as the official tennis ball supplier to The Championships at Wimbledon, and it remains the longest unbroken sporting sponsorship in history.

In 1910, a public company was incorporated to acquire Slazenger and Sons, "manufacturers of sports equipment, india rubber, gutta percha and waterproof goods, leather merchants and dealers", which floated on the stock market. In 1931, Slazenger acquired H. Gradidge and Sons.

War years (1939–1945) 
During the Second World War, Slazenger, like most nonessential manufacturing in the UK, redirected its production to manufacture a wide variety of items for military purposes, utilising Slazenger's expertise in wood and rubber manufacturing.

On 15 September 1940, during the Blitz on London, incendiary bombs fell on the Slazenger factory. The Gradidge factory in Woolwich similarly suffered. The competing William Sykes Ltd factory at Horbury was undamaged by the bombings. Slazenger and Gradidge were able to continue production at other facilities but began a series of mergers with competing companies. In 1942, it acquired William Sykes Ltd to broaden its wartime production facilities. Around 1943, Slazenger acquired F. H. Ayres. Founded in the year of 1810 by Edward Ayres, the firm manufactured a range of sporting equipment. It was best known as a quality manufacturing of equipment for archery, in particular, the bow (or longbow as it is more commonly known). Thereafter the company was known as Slazenger Sykes Gradidge and Ayres.

The following lists a snapshot of some of their larger contracts completed for the UK Government in the years 1939–1945, as recorded by Slazenger, Gradidge, Sykes and Ayres in 1946:

Slazenger in New South Wales, Australia, produced naval utility launches at Newcastle, NSW for their WW II effort.

At its peak 

In its heyday, the empire of Slazenger Gradidge Sykes and Ayres stretched across the world with either licensed distributors or agents and/or manufacturing operations in which the company had partnerships or licensing agreements with. Distributors were flung far and wide as far away as New Zealand and Africa, in remote places such as Iceland, Newfoundland, Madagascar and even Bolivia.

Selling a brand 
In the days when wooden tennis racquets held no peer, brands such as Slazenger and Dunlop were a dominant force in the world, but with the popularity of the metal tennis racquets from the early 1980s and then the fast transition to even more popular composite materials such as fiberglass, graphite, Kevlar and so on more and more brands became available to the consumer. The new brands became popular due to their ability to meet consumer trends and demand for the new technology. Slazenger was slow to react. The company could not re-gear its existing factories to produce products in the new materials and there was a major existing investment in plant and raw materials. The company tried to market its product against these new products using quality as the unique selling point, but the quality level of imports quickly improved and soon Slazenger lost popularity and fell from prominence.

 1959: Ralph Slazenger Jr. sold the family business to Dunlop Rubber.
 1985: Dunlop Rubber was purchased by BTR plc, which formed a Sports Group combining Slazenger with the Dunlop Sport branded goods.
 1996: BTR sold Dunlop Sport in a management buyout for £300 million – the buyout was backed by investment company Cinven. The new company was to be known as "Dunlop Slazenger".
 2004: CINVen sold Dunlop Slazenger to Sports Direct International for a reported £40 million, who in turn sold on the rights to the Slazenger Golf brand in Europe to JJB Sports.

Global rights and licensing 

The purchase of Dunlop Slazenger by Sports World International (SWI) did not confer global rights to the brand. SWI chose not to diversify the brands it acquired internally, and thus strain its own resources and finances, but to license them globally.  With Slazenger, this was achieved successfully, with the Slazenger name being seen on a wide range of products not previously associated with the brand, such as sunglasses, toiletries and push bikes.

In Australia and New Zealand, the Slazenger brand is owned and licensed by Pacific Brands, with full and exclusive rights to sell and distribute throughout those territories. From the early 2000s due to poor management sales plummeted. Rather than investing in the brand, the Slazenger management began downsizing staff numbers, closing branches, cutting back long-standing sponsorship as well as stripping back costs elsewhere within the business. Despite these radical moves the Slazenger brand still ultimately offered no real return to Pacific Brands and in 2010/11 they sub-licensed it to Spartan Sports who had been operating in Australia since 2005 and is owned by Spartan Sports in Jallandhar, India (established in 1954).

Products 
Range of products under the brand Slazenger includes:

Sponsorships 

During its peak, many famous cricket players such as Sir Don Bradman, Sir Garfield Sobers, Sir Viv Richards, Sir Len Hutton, Denis Compton, Rohan Kanhai, Mark Waugh, Jacques Kallis , Jason Roy, James Anderson Geoffrey Boycott used Slazenger's bats and products. The Pakistan cricket team wore the Slazenger kit in their winning campaign during the 2009 ICC World Twenty20.

There are also many famous golf players who have used Slazenger products, such as Jack Nicklaus, Seve Ballesteros, Tom Weiskopf, Tom Watson and Johnny Miller. Besides professional golf players, film-star Sean Connery also wore the Slazenger v-neck jumper while playing golf in his free time. Furthermore, in the golf scene at Stoke Park Golf Club in Buckinghamshire in the James Bond film Goldfinger (1964), he wears a burgundy v-neck Slazenger jumper and the Slazenger brand of golf balls are shown on screen and mentioned several times in dialogue—Bond: "You play a Slazenger 1, don't you?"—as they play a key plot point.

References

External links 
 

 
British brands
English brands
Sportswear brands
Cricket equipment manufacturers
Golf equipment manufacturers
Tennis equipment manufacturers
Clothing companies of England
Sporting goods manufacturers of the United Kingdom
Manufacturing companies established in 1881
1881 establishments in England
Companies based in Derbyshire
Sports Direct